Jacob Fischer Friis (born 11 December 1976) is a Danish professional football manager and former player who is the head coach of Danish Superliga club Viborg.

Playing career
Friis was team captain of the AaB reserve team playing in the fourth tier Denmark Series before retiring due to injury in 2002–03. Beside AaB, he also played for two years for Aalborg Chang (1999–01).

Managerial career

Beginnings
Friis started his career as a coach in connection with a job as an assistant coach for AaB's seventh-tier Series 3 team. He then continued as an assistant coach for AaB's reserves, playing in the fourth-tier Denmark Series, where he remained until the summer of 2006.

In the summer of 2006, Friis travelled to Mexico, where he was to teach English at Instituto CEFI and coach their football team. However, the job as a football coach was not satisfactory for Friis, and instead an opportunity arose for Friis to be part of the coaching staff around Monterrey's university team, Tigres UANL.

AaB
When Allan Kuhn resigned as a result of a finding a new coaching job at Malmö FF, Friis became the new assistant coach at AaB in January 2016 under head coach Lars Søndergaard. He had already been promised a promotion to the assistant coaching position from the summer of 2016, but these plans were advanced with the premature change of head coach.

Søndergaard was dismissed in December 2016. Morten Wieghorst signed with AaB as their new head coach in early-January 2017, and Friis was appointed his main assistant with Thomas Augustinussen as second assistant. He signed an ongoing contract extension at the end of March 2018.

In the fall of 2018, AaB won just one match out of 12 possible, and Wieghorst was subsequently fired on 26 November 2018. As his interim, Friis was appointed head coach for the three remaining matches in the Danish Superliga during the fall. Friis' first match in charge resulted in a 1–4 win over Esbjerg fB on 1 December 2018. Despite AaB losing the next match 2–4 at home to AC Horsens on 9 December, Friis was still signed on a permanent deal for the remained of the 2018–19 season.

Friis stepped back from the position as head coach of AaB on 29 October 2020, due to personal reasons related to his daughter fighting leukaemia. Assistant Peter Feher took over as caretaker manager with Rasmus Würtz continuing as assistant.

Viborg
On 3 February 2022, Friis was appointed head coach of Superliga club Viborg, leaving his job as coach of the Denmark national under-19 women.

Education
In August 2015, Friis acquired the UEFA Pro Licence, also known as the 'P licence'; the highest coaching education. His final assignment was entitled Afslutningspil fra mellemrum - Mod etableret forsvar (Finishing from the red zone - against established defense).

Personal life
Friis was born in Aalborg, Denmark, and grew up in Aalborg Øst where he attended Mellervangsskolen. While managing AaB he lived in Vodskov northeast of Aalborg with his wife, Merle, and three children.

Career statistics

Managerial

References

1976 births
Living people
Aalborg Chang players
Danish football managers
AaB Fodbold managers
Viborg FF managers
Danish Superliga managers
Expatriate sportspeople in Mexico
Danish expatriate sportspeople in Mexico
Danish men's footballers
Association footballers not categorized by position
Sportspeople from Aalborg